In mathematics, Ihara's lemma, introduced by  and named by , states that the kernel of the sum of the two p-degeneracy maps from J0(N)×J0(N) to J0(Np) is Eisenstein whenever the prime p does not divide N. Here J0(N) is the Jacobian of the compactification of the modular curve of Γ0(N).

References

Lemmas in number theory